The Chosen Ones (German: Die Auserwählten) is a 2014 drama film directed by Christoph Röhl. It was premiered at the Munich Film Festival in 2014 and was first broadcast on 1 October 2014. The film tells the story of a well-publicized child sexual abuse scandal at the Odenwaldschule, a German private boarding school known for its progressive education.

Production 
The Chosen Ones is a fictionalized account of a sexual abuse scandal that took place at the Odenwaldschule. The abuse first came to light in 1998 when two former pupils reported their abuse. Their story appeared in the Frankfurter Rundschau but was not reported on by other media outlets. The story resurfaced in 2010 when it was revealed that more than 130 pupils had been sexually abused by and at least 8 teachers in the 1970s and 1980s. Recent studies have subsequently established that between 500 and 900 children were abused at the school.

Director Christoph Röhl was an English tutor at the school from 1989 to 1991. In 2011 he dealt with the same subject matter in the documentary film We're Not The Only Ones (German: Und wir sind nicht die Einzigen). After lengthy negotiations, the board of directors at the Odenwaldschule granted the filmmakers permission for their film to be shot on their premises. In 2015, two years after the film was completed, the Odenwaldschule was forced to close.

Awards 
 Nomination Prix Europa 2014
 Winner New York Festival 2014 – Gold World Medal
 Winner ZOOM lgualada Festival 2014 – Best Fiction Film
 Nomination Deutscher Hörfilmpreis 2015 – Best TV Movie

References

External links 

2014 films
2014 television films
2014 drama films
German drama films
German television films
2010s German-language films
Films set in the 1970s
Films set in the 1980s
Films set in West Germany
Films set in boarding schools
2010s German films
Das Erste original programming